Who's Sorry Now? is the first studio album recorded by U. S. Entertainer Connie Francis.

Background
By 1957, none of Connie Francis' first nine solo singles had charted. Her duet single with Marvin Rainwater, "The Majesty Of Love", b/w "You, my Darlin' You" had only been a minor hit, peaking at # 93 (though it sold over one million copies). As a result of these failures, the managers at MGM Records had decided not to renew her contract after the last scheduled single release.

During what was supposed to be her last recording session for MGM Records in October 1957, Francis recorded a cover version of the song "Who's Sorry Now?". For quite some time, Francis' father, George Franconero Sr., had wanted his daughter to record this song with a contemporary arrangement, but the discussion had become heated and Francis had refused to record it, considering the song old fashioned and corny. Her father persisted and Francis agreed.

As her father had predicted, "Who's Sorry Now?", released as MGM Records Single K 12588, became a huge hit.  With this success, MGM Records renewed the contract with Francis. The recording sessions for a new album, which would include the breakthrough hit, began in March 1958 and were completed in April 1958.

The album's formula is clearly inspired by the arrangement of its title song: Choose Standards from the time between the 1910s and 1940s, but present them in a contemporary arrangement. To give the album some diversity in music styles, there were two exceptions:  "My Melancholy Baby" and "How Deep is the Ocean," which featured grand orchestra arrangements. 
When the album was released in May 1958, it failed to chart. The album was re-packaged with a new cover design and re-released in March 1962.

Track listing

Side A

Side B

Not included songs from the sessions

References

Connie Francis albums
1958 debut albums
MGM Records albums